2013 Tochigi SC season.

League table

J2 League

References

External links
 J.League official site

Tochigi SC
Tochigi SC seasons